Fernandina may refer to:
Fernandina Beach, Florida
Original Town of Fernandina Historic Site
Fernandina Island, Galapagos Islands
Fernandina (fruit), a citrus fruit